Nazokat Anvarovna Kasimova (born 1969) is an Uzbekistani political scientist, also noted for her work within the field of higher education reform.

Kasimova was born in Tashkent, and is the daughter of noted Indologist and Turkologist Anvar Kasimov; she has one sister, Mumtoz, and two brothers, Mahmod and Muzaffar. Their grandfather was the military leader Mahmud Kasimov. She graduated from the faculty of history of Tashkent State University in 1991. She attended graduate school at the University of Washington from 1993 to 1994, and in 1995, at the University of World Economy and Diplomacy, she defended her thesis, on the subject of diplomatic relations between the United States, Nazi Germany, the United Kingdom, and the Soviet Union in the buildup to World War II; she received her doctoral degree from that institution in 2002. She has worked at the Woodrow Wilson International Center for Scholars, in 2000, and at Tsukuba University, in 2008. In 2011 she was a Fulbright Scholar at American University. She has published over 40 papers during her career, and is active with numerous international organizations. She currently teaches at the University of World Economy and Diplomacy. Her area of specialization is the Bologna Process; within that subject she is concerned with such issues as promoting mobility, introducing a system of credits, and promoting cooperation with Europe in the field of quality assurance.

References

1969 births
Living people
Uzbekistani political scientists
Uzbekistani women writers
Women political scientists
National University of Uzbekistan alumni
University of Washington alumni
Writers from Tashkent
20th-century Uzbekistani women
21st-century Uzbekistani women